America After 9/11 is a 2021 television documentary film about the response of the United States government towards the September 11 attacks and its various consequences which eventually led to a deeply divided country two decades later. Produced by the investigative journalism program Frontline on PBS, the film explores how people's xenophobia and mistrust in government grew as the War on Terror in response to the attacks advanced over the years despite criticisms and controversies, reaching a climax in the 2021 attack on the United States Capitol.

Directed by Michael Kirk and written by Kirk and Mike Wiser, the film first aired on PBS stations on September 7, 2021 in commemoration of the attacks' 20th anniversary.

Interviewees
Rasha Al Aqeedi, Newlines Institute for Strategy and Policy
Peter Baker, author, Obama: The Call of History
Rajiv Chandrasekaran, author, Little America
Jelani Cobb, The New Yorker writer
Bruce Hoffman, author, Inside Terrorism
Jane Meyer, The New Yorker writer
Colin Powell, fmr. secretary of state
Ben Rhodes, fmr. Obama adviser
Tom Ricks, journalist and author
Eugene Robinson, The Washington Post
David Sanger, author, The Inheritance
Emma Sky, NATO adviser, Coalition Provisional Authority
Ali Soufan, fmr. FBI agent
Darlene Superville, Associated Press journalist
Col. Larry Wilkerson, fmr. chief of staff
Philip Zelikow, exec. dir. of the 9/11 Commission

Production
Frontline announced on August 13, 2021 its new television documentary film America After 9/11, which was released on September 7, 2021 in commemoration of the 20th anniversary of the September 11 attacks. Director Michael Kirk stated that his documentary "offers a powerful historical record of how 9/11 ushered in an era of fear, mistrust and division in America [....] Our reporting has shown that only by tracing 9/11's complex legacy can we fully understand the path to the present — from the values compromised, to the trust eroded, to the wars abroad, to the insurrection at home."

Critical response
James Poniewozik of The New York Times called the film one of "two of the [September 11 attacks'] anniversary's most striking documentaries" (alongside Spike Lee's film NYC Epicenters 9/11→2021½). Poniewozik stated that "the filmmaker Michael Kirk lays it out economically: The attacks set off a chain of action and changes — military quagmires, suspicion and racism at home, the loss of trust in institutions — that demagogues used to undermine democracy, and that fulfilled Osama bin Laden’s goal of dividing and weakening America. [...] The dark side won, 'America After 9/11' argues."

References

External links
 
PBS official site

2021 films
2021 television films
2021 documentary films
American documentary television films
Documentary films about war
Frontline (American TV program)
PBS original programming
Films directed by Michael Kirk
2020s English-language films
2020s American films